Fiduciary Trust Company is a private wealth management firm headquartered in Boston, Mass United States.  It serves high-net-worth families, individuals and nonprofits, as well as professional financial advisors and family offices. The firm provides customized wealth management, investment management, and trust and estate settlement services, as well as family office, tax, and custody services. 

, Fiduciary Trust had approximately $12.2 billion in assets under supervision  The firm is ranked fifth on the Boston Business Journal’s 2017 list of the largest independent investment advisors in Massachusetts. Fiduciary Trust Company is not affiliated with  the similarly named Fiduciary Trust Company International, which is a wholly owned subsidiary of Franklin Templeton Investments.

History 
Fiduciary Trust Company was founded in 1885 as a family office, and incorporated as a trust bank in 1928 by Robert H. Gardiner.

By 2017, the firm’s parent company, Fiduciary Company, Inc. (FCI), was an independent firm owned by current and former employees, directors and clients. FCI and Fiduciary Trust Company have identical boards of directors. In 2014, the company established the affiliated Fiduciary Trust Company of New England, based in Manchester, New Hampshire. 

Fiduciary Trust Company is headquartered in the Fiduciary Trust Building, at 175 Federal Street, Boston, Massachusetts.

Management 
Austin V. Shapard has been  President and CEO of Fiduciary Trust since 2014. He is the eighth president of the company. His predecessors include: Douglas Smith-Peterson, Daniel Phillips, Gilman Nichols, Edward Osgood, and Robert Gardiner.

References

External links 
 

Financial services companies of the United States
Companies based in Boston
1985 establishments in the United States
1985 establishments in Massachusetts
American companies established in 1985
Financial services companies established in 1985
Companies established in 1985